The Hope and Anchor was a grade II listed public house Welham Green, Hertfordshire. It is based on a 17th-century timber frame with later additions.

References

External links

Pubs in Welwyn Hatfield (district)
Grade II listed pubs in Hertfordshire
Timber framed buildings in Hertfordshire